Harry Matthews (December 9, 1922 – February 21, 2003) nicknamed Kid Matthews was an American Professional boxer who competed from 1937 to 1956. He climbed to a top contender rank and scored 90 victories, lost 7 times, drew 5 times and 1 no contest. His most impressive wins were over former champions Al Hostak, Bob Murphy and Ezzard Charles. He lost to :Rocky Marciano in 1952, who went on to becoming World Champion less than two months after their fight. There were plans to cut weight and fight Sugar Ray Robinson but the fight didn't happen.

Background

Harry Matthews was born in Emmett, Idaho. He moved to Seattle where he started working out and training.

Boxing career 
He fought and managed to beat Eddie Booker and former champion Al Hostak before being recruited into the American Army for World War 2. This made him stop fighting for a while due to fighting a war.

After returning from the war he went on a long winning streak, including beating Irish Bob Murphy. Matthews and his manager wanted the heavyweight division title, but there were also plans of cutting weight and fighting with Sugar Ray Robinson. The fight however didn't end up happening.

After beating Freddie Beshore, Danny Nardico and Rex Layne, with Rex a top contender, he ended up in a fight against other top contender (at the time) and future world champion Rocky Marciano. Both men had impressive winning streaks. Marciano was unbeaten and had a high knockout percentage while Matthews had no losses since he returned from WW2. Rocky Marciano won by knockout with a vicious double left hook. Matthews scored wins over Ted Lowry, Harley Breshears and Ezzard Charles, but lost to Don Cockell.

Matthews was managed by promoter Jack Hurley.(18 November 1972). Jack Hurley Dies; Boxing Manager, The New York Times

After Boxing 
Later in life, Harry Matthews was also a trainer of professional boxer Ibar Arrington. He died on February 21, 2003, in Seattle at the age 80.

References

1922 births
2003 deaths
American male boxers
United States Army personnel of World War II